is a Japanese video game director and producer who works for Nintendo. Kimura joined the company as a trainee in 1988, and designed the characters of Super Mario Bros. 3. After that, he was originally assigned to Gunpei Yokoi and the Nintendo R&D1 team. Kimura designed a variety of games for Nintendo including several of the NES Zapper software and the Metroid series. Shortly after working on Super Metroid, Kimura was transferred to Shigeru Miyamoto and the Nintendo EAD group.

He is also the manager of Nintendo's Entertainment Planning & Development (EPD) Group No. 10, which oversees the Super Mario 2D games and the Pikmin franchise.

Works

References

1965 births
Japanese video game producers
Japanese video game directors
Living people
Metroid
Nintendo people
Video game artists